DNA methyltransferase 1-associated protein 1 is an enzyme that in humans is encoded by the DMAP1 gene.

Function 

This gene encodes a subunit of several, distinct complexes involved in the repression or activation of transcription. The encoded protein can independently repress transcription and is targeted to replication foci throughout S phase by interacting directly with the N-terminus of DNA methyltransferase 1. During late S phase, histone deacetylase 2 is added to this complex, providing a means to deacetylate histones in transcriptionally inactive heterochromatin following replication. The encoded protein is also a component of the nucleosome acetyltransferase of H4 complex and interacts with the transcriptional corepressor tumor susceptibility gene 101 and the pro-apoptotic death-associated protein 6, among others. Alternatively spliced transcript variants encoding the same protein have been described.

Interactions 

DMAP1 has been shown to interact with:
 C19orf2, 
 DNMT1, 
 ING1, and
 RGS6

References

Further reading